Evergestis obscuralis is a moth in the family Crambidae. It was described by George Hampson in 1912. It is found in Venezuela.

References

Evergestis
Moths described in 1912
Moths of South America